This is an incomplete list of mayors of Fredericton, New Brunswick.

Mayors
John Simpson, Esq. (1848–1853)
 James Scott Beek - three consecutive terms beginning 1859
William Hayden Needham
John Adolphus Beckwith (1863–1864)
Edward Ludlow Wetmore (1874–1876)
John Douglas Hazen (1888–1889)
Thomas Carleton Allen (1890–1892)
Harry Fulton McLeod (1907–1908)
Richard Hanson (1918–1920)
William George Clark (1925–1935)
G. Willard Kitchen (1936–1937) 
Ray T. Forbes (1941-1949)
Henry Stanley Wright (1949–1956)
William T. Walker (1957–1969)
Bud Bird (1969–1974)
Elbridge Wilkins (1974–1986)
Brad Woodside (1986–1999)
Walter Brown (interim, 1999)
Sandy DiGiacinto (1999–2001)
Les Hull (2001–2004)
Brad Woodside (2004–2016)
Mike O'Brien (2016–2021)
Kate Rogers (2021–present)

References

Fredericton